This is a list of notable street newspapers. A street newspaper is a newspaper or magazine sold by homeless or poor individuals and produced mainly to support these populations.  Most such newspapers primarily provide coverage about homelessness and poverty-related issues, and seek to strengthen social networks within homeless communities. Street papers aim to give these individuals both employment opportunities and a voice in their community.  In addition to being sold by homeless individuals, many of these papers are partially produced and written by them.

Street newspapers

Africa
  The Big Issue Malawi
Asia
  The Jeepney Magazine
 The Big Issue (Australia)
Europe
  Aluma Sweden
  Arts of the Working Class 
 The Big Issue United Kingdom
 The Big Issue in Scotland
 Cais Portugal
 Dik Manusch Sweden
 Faktum Sweden
 Fedél Nélkül Hungary
 Hinz&Kunzt (Hamburg) Germany
 Hus Forbi Denmark
 Iso Numero (fi)
 Kralji ulice Ljubljana, Slovenia
 Megaphon Austria
 Nota Bene (magazine) 
 Nový prostor Czech Republic
 Put Domoi St. Petersburg & Ukraine
 Scarp de' tenis Italy
 Shedia (Σχεδία)
 Situation Sthlm Sweden

North America
  The Bridge
  The Challenger Newspaper, Austin, Texas
  Change of Heart
  The Cleveland Street Chronicle
  The Contributor
  The Denver Voice, Denver Colorado
  The Dominion
  Edmonton Street News
  Groundcover News Ann Arbor, Michigan
  The Homeless Voice
  Hobo News 
  Homeless Grapevine
  The Journey (street newspaper) Fort Worth, Texas
  The Ottawa Wrench
  Real Change, Seattle, Washington
  Spare Change News
  Streetvibes Cincinnati
  Street News
  Street Roots
  Street Sense
  Street Sheet 
  Street Sheet (Wilmington) Wilmington, North Carolina
  Street Sheet Canada founded by Rodney Graham in Winnipeg, Manitoba
  Street Sights Providence, Rhode Island
  Street Speech Columbus, Ohio
  Street Spirit Oakland, CA
  StreetWise  - Chicago, Illinois
  Toronto Street News
  Word on the Street

See also

  International Network of Street Papers
 Street News Service
  North American Street Newspaper Association

References

Further reading

External links
 

 
Street newspapers
Street